Choir Boy is an American synth-pop band from Salt Lake City, Utah. The band consists of vocalist and multi-instrumentalist Adam Klopp, guitarist Michael Paulsen, bassist Chaz Costello and keyboardist/saxophonist Jeff Kleinman.

The band's sound is reminiscent of styles from the 1980s including synth-pop, dream pop, indie pop and post-punk. It has drawn comparisons to artists ranging from Kate Bush, Bryan Ferry, The Cure and The Smiths.

History 

The name "Choir Boy” was chosen to reclaim a nickname previously used to torment lead singer Adam Klopp as a teenager when he fronted bands in his hometown of Cleveland, Ohio. Klopp was raised in a devout religious household and sang in choirs growing up but was insulted when he entered the DIY punk scene. Klopp moved from Cleveland to Provo, Utah to attend Brigham Young University, where he played in multiple bands including the chamber pop and indie folk band Bat Manors, which he sang in and wrote a song titled "Choir Boy". Seeking a fresh start to suit his new musical style, he started a project with the new name Choir Boy.

Choir Boy released their debut album, Passive With Desire, in 2016 on Team Love Records. They then signed to Dais Records, following up their first album with the 2018 single "Sunday Light". Their second album, Gathering Swans, was released in May 2020 to positive reviews.

Reception 
New Noise Magazine praised their second album, Gathering Swans, saying that it “has elements that everyone wants in sensible pop; danceable, memorable, meaningful, powerful, music and lyrics that stay with you and don’t need to beg for repeated listens.” Newsweek was equally positive, saying that the “second album from Choir Boy mastermind Adam Klopp features a dramatically moving vocal performance all throughout.” Paste also gave the album a good review, saying that “Choir Boy is one-of-a-kind band with a one-of-a-kind sound.”

Band members

Permanent lineup 
 Adam Klopp — vocals, synths, guitar, piano, percussion and sequencing
 Michael Paulsen — guitar
 Chaz Costello — bass
 Jeff Kleinman — keyboard, saxophone

Past members 
 Katrina Marie Ricks Peterson — bass, vocals
 Bret Meisenbach — guitar
 Jacob Hall — drums
 Kyle Hooper — keyboard
 Alyssa Pyper — strings

Discography

Albums 
 Passive with Desire (Team Love, 2016)
 Gathering Swans (Dais Records, 2020)

References 

Musical groups from Salt Lake City
2016 establishments in Utah